The 2023 Coastal Carolina Chanticleers football team will represent Coastal Carolina University as a member of  the East Division of the Sun Belt Conference during the 2022 NCAA Division I FBS football season. The Chanticleers, led by first year head coach Tim Beck, will play their home games at Brooks Stadium in Conway, South Carolina.

Previous season

The Chanticleers finished the 2022 season 9–4, 6–2 in Sun Belt play to finish in first place in the East Division. They played Troy in the Sun Belt Championship, losing 45–26. They played East Carolina in the Birmingham Bowl they lost 53–29.

Offseason

Coaching changes
On December 4, 2022, head coach Jamey Chadwell left to become the head coach at Liberty. Later that day, the Chanticleers hired Tim Beck who had been the offensive coordinator at NC State, to be their next head coach.

On Decmember 18, 2022, the Chanticleers hired SMU's Craig Naivar as their defensive coordinator. At SMU he was their safties and special teams coach.

On January 6, 2023, the Chanticleers hired Travis Trickett as their offensive coordinator and Xavier Dye as their running backs coach. They both had the same roles at South Florida. The same day, Beck made more announcements for his coaching staff. He named Derek Warehime the offensive line coach, he named Kriss Procter as the tight ends coach, Perry Parks as the receviers coach, Jimmy Brumbaugh as the defensive line coach, Curtis Fuller as the cornerbacks coach, and Josh Miller as the outside linebackers and special teams coach. Additionally Quinn Barham was named the director of football speed.

Schedule
The football schedule was announced February 24, 2023.

References

Coastal Carolina
Coastal Carolina Chanticleers football seasons
Coastal Carolina Chanticleers football